Eugenie Anderson (May 26, 1909 – March 31, 1997), also known as Helen Eugenie Moore Anderson, was a United States diplomat. She is best known as the first woman appointed chief of mission at the ambassador level in US history.

Personal life
Helen Eugenie Moore was born on May 26, 1909, in Adair, Iowa, one of five children of Rev. Ezekial A. Moore, a Methodist minister, and his wife, FloraBelle. She concentrated in music as a student, and attended the Juilliard School in New York; her original hope was to become a concert pianist. She was a member of the Iowa Beta chapter of Pi Beta Phi Women's Fraternity at Simpson College. She transferred to Carleton College in 1929, where she graduated in 1931. It was there she met her husband, John Pierce Anderson, whom she married in 1929 and with whom she had two children, Hans and Johanna.

Public life
 
Anderson's interest in international affairs had been stirred by a trip to Europe in 1937, where in Germany she first saw a totalitarian state in action, as she recalled. On her return she spoke frequently for the League of Women Voters, fighting the strong isolationist policies of the time.

Anderson helped to create the Minnesota Democratic-Farmer-Labor Party in 1944. Four years later, as one of the few women, she was elected to an office in the national Democratic Party. In 1948, as the DFL split from the national Democratic Party in a controversy over goals and ideology, she supported Hubert H. Humphrey. She was rewarded for this support in 1949, when she was appointed by President Truman as U.S. ambassador to Denmark (1949–1953). Truman's appointment made her the first woman appointed chief of mission at the ambassador level in US history. (The first female chief of mission at the minister rank was Ruth Bryan Owen in 1933). Despite undercurrents of sexism and discomfort in the press with her career flaunting gender roles, she was well-known in Denmark and was sometimes called "Auntie Anderson" by the media. Her popularity and high profile allowed her to exert some political force: she convinced Denmark to make a stronger commitment to NATO, strengthened the Greenland Treaty, and in 1950 became the first American woman to sign a treaty, with the Treaty of Commerce and Friendship with Denmark, which she drafted. When she resigned from this position in 1953, King Frederik IX awarded her the Grand Cross of the Order of Dannebrog, a high honor.

In 1958 Anderson campaigned for, but did not win, the DFL nomination for U.S. Senator, which ultimately went to Eugene McCarthy. She was later appointed by Kennedy to be ambassador to Bulgaria (1962–1964). Thus Anderson became the first American woman to represent the United States in a country allied with the Soviet Union.

After her retirement from these posts, President Johnson appointed Anderson to the United Nations Trusteeship Council and a year later she served on the United Nations Committee for Decolonization.

References

"Eugenie Anderson ‘held her own in smoke-filled rooms’" Minnesota Lawyer. June 28, 2017

External links
 
 Helen Eugenie Moore Anderson in MNopedia, the Minnesota Encyclopedia
Mrs. Ambassador: The Life and Politics of Eugenie Anderson Paperback – March 1, 2019

1909 births
1997 deaths
Ambassadors of the United States to Denmark
Ambassadors of the United States to Bulgaria
American women ambassadors
People from Iowa
Articles containing video clips
American United Methodists
Carleton College alumni
Grand Crosses of the Order of the Dannebrog
20th-century Methodists